Acidon nigribasis is a moth of the family Erebidae first described by George Hampson in 1895. It is found in India, Sri Lanka, and Borneo.

The adult wingspan is 21 – 23 mm. Its wings are greyish brown or dark brown with white scales. Ciliated antennae and eye rim grayish brown. Its short palpi and thorax are dark brown to chocolate brown in color. The black-brown root area is distinctive. The hindwing is gray brown.

References

Moths of Asia
Moths described in 1913
Erebidae
Hypeninae